The 1969 South American Rugby Championship was the sixth edition of the competition of the leading national Rugby Union teams in South America.

The tournament was played in Santiago and won by Argentina.

Standings 

{| class="wikitable"
|-
!width=165|Team
!width=40|Played
!width=40|Won
!width=40|Drawn
!width=40|Lost
!width=40|For
!width=40|Against
!width=40|Difference
!width=40|Pts
|- bgcolor=#ccffcc align=center
|align=left| 
|2||2||0||0||95||6||+89||4
|- align=center
|align=left| 
|2||1||0||1||13||60||−47||2
|- align=center
|align=left| 
|2||0||0||2||12||54||−42||0
|}

Results

References
 IRB – South American Championship 1969

1969
1969 rugby union tournaments for national teams
1969 in Argentine rugby union
rugby union
rugby union
International rugby union competitions hosted by Chile
October 1969 sports events in South America